Adrian John Rawlins (born 27 March 1958) is an English actor best known for playing Arthur Kidd in The Woman in Black and James Potter in the Harry Potter films. In 2019, he starred in Chernobyl as Nikolai Fomin.

Early life
Rawlins was born in Stoke-on-Trent, Staffordshire, the son of Mavis (née Leese) and Edward Rawlins, a market trader. Rawlins was educated at Stanfield Technical High School in Stoke-on-Trent and the Stoke VI Form College. He then studied art and acting at Manchester Metropolitan University.

Career
Rawlins has appeared in several films including Wilbur Wants to Kill Himself, and also has a pivotal role in the Harry Potter film series as Harry Potter's father James Potter. Onstage, he has appeared in Her Naked Skin (2008, National Theatre). He played Richard Collingsworth in the 1989 TV serial version of The Ginger Tree, opposite Samantha Bond. He also starred in The Woman in Black which was made for television and aired at Christmas 1989.

Since 2014, he has volunteered at East Riding Theatre in East Riding of Yorkshire, becoming artistic director in 2015.

Filmography

Film

Television

Video games

Theatre credits

Awards and nominations

References

External links

Adrian Rawlins at the Hampstead Theatre

1958 births
Living people
English male film actors
English male television actors
English male stage actors
People from Stoke-on-Trent
Actors from Staffordshire
20th-century English male actors
21st-century English male actors